The El Dorado Solar Power Plant is a 10 megawatt (MWAC) photovoltaic power plant  located near Boulder City, Nevada and completed in December 2008.  It was built by First Solar as a demonstration plant for Sempra Generation, and is now part of Sempra's multi-unit Copper Mountain Solar Facility.   The power from the original 10 MW plant is being sold to Pacific Gas & Electric under a separate 20-year power purchase agreement.

See also
Solar power in Nevada
List of power stations in Nevada

References

Solar power in the Mojave Desert
Buildings and structures in Boulder City, Nevada
Solar power stations in Nevada
Photovoltaic power stations in the United States
Energy infrastructure completed in 2008
2008 establishments in Nevada